Tajikistan participated in the 2018 Asian Games in Jakarta and Palembang, Indonesia from 18 August to 2 September 2018. This event marks as the seventh appearance for Tajikistan since 1994 Hiroshima Games. The best achievement by medals was in 2006 Doha by collecting 2 gold and 2 bronze medals. At the last edition in Incheon, Tajikistan captured a gold, a silver, and 3 bronze medals, made the country standing in 23rd position, as their best ranking since the first occasion.

Tajikistan sent more than 80 athletes competing in 16 sporting events at this Games. Wrestler Rustam Iskandari assigned as a flag bearer at the opening ceremony parade.

Medalists

The following Tajikistan competitors won medals at the Games.

|  style="text-align:left; width:78%; vertical-align:top;"|

|  style="text-align:left; width:22%; vertical-align:top;"|

Competitors 
The following is a list of the number of competitors representing Tajikistan that participated at the Games:

Archery 

Recurve

Athletics 

Tajikistan entered six athletes (5 men's and 1 women) to participate in the athletics competition at the Games.

Boxing 

Men

Women

Canoeing 

Tajikistan participated in the canoeing with six men's athlete who competing in six different events.

Sprint

Qualification legend: QF=Final; QS=Semifinal

Football 

Tajikistan Football Federation  entered their women's team to participate at the Games, and were drawn in the Group B at the Games.

Summary

Women's tournament 

Roster

Group B

Ju-jitsu 

Men

Judo 

Tajikistan participated in Judo at the games with 8 athletes.

Men

Women

Karate 

Tajikistan participated in the karate competition at the Games with three athletes (2 men's and 1 women).

Kurash 

Tajikistan participated in the kurash competition with seven male athletes.
Men

Sambo 

Tajikistan participated in the sambo competition with four men's athletes.

Shooting 

Men

Women

Mixed team

Swimming

Tajikistan prepared their athletes who will compete at the Games.

Men

Women

Taekwondo 

Tajikistan competed in taekwondo event with four athletes (3 men's and 1 women).

Kyorugi

Weightlifting

Men

Wrestling 

Tajikistan put-up 9 men's wrestlers at the Games. Six wrestlers competed in the freestyle event, while 3 wrestlers in the Greco-Roman events.

Men's freestyle

Men's Greco-Roman

Wushu 

Sanda

References 

Nations at the 2018 Asian Games
2018
Asian Games